The Best of L'Arc-en-Ciel C/W is a compilation album released by L'Arc-en-Ciel on March 19, 2003, simultaneously with The Best of L'Arc-en-Ciel 1994–1998 and The Best of L'Arc-en-Ciel 1998–2000. It collects previously released B-sides. The album reached number eight on the Oricon Albums Chart and charted for nine weeks.

Track listing

* Remix by Yukihiro.

Credits
 Hyde – vocals
 Ken – guitar
 Tetsu – bass guitar, backing vocals
 Sakura/Yukihiro – drums

Charts

References

L'Arc-en-Ciel albums
B-side compilation albums
2003 compilation albums
Ki/oon Records albums